Greenwood is a town in Sussex County, Delaware, United States. The population was 973 at the 2010 census, an increase of 16.2% over the previous decade. It is part of the Salisbury, Maryland-Delaware Metropolitan Statistical Area.

History
The Richards Historic District was listed on the National Register of Historic Places in 1983. 

The official Delaware snow depth record was established near Greenwood on February 7, 2010 after the February 5–6, 2010 North American blizzard resulted in a measurement of 28 inches. The record was measured at the Greenwood 2.9 SE station of the Community Collaborative Rain, Hail and Snow Network.

Geography

According to the United States Census Bureau, the town has a total area of  all  land.

Transportation

Road is the main method of transport to and from Greenwood. U.S. Route 13 (Sussex Highway) is the main highway serving the town, connecting to points north and south. Delaware Route 16 and Delaware Route 36 also pass through concurrently on an east-west alignment along Market Street. The Delmarva Central Railroad's Delmarva Subdivision line passes north-south through Greenwood.

Demographics

At the 2000 census there were 837 people, 335 households, and 211 families living in the town. The racial makeup of the town was 74.91% White, 22.58% African American, 1.08% Asian, 0.12% Pacific Islander, 0.24% from other races, and 1.08% from two or more races. Hispanic or Latino of any race were 2.87%.

Of the 335 households 38.2% had children under the age of 18 living with them, 41.2% were married couples living together, 14.3% had a female householder with no husband present, and 37.0% were non-families. 31.9% of households were one person and 14.6% were one person aged 65 or older.  The average household size was 2.50 and the average family size was 3.15.

The age distribution was 31.8% under the age of 18, 10.6% from 18 to 24, 29.3% from 25 to 44, 15.4% from 45 to 64, and 12.9% 65 or older.  The median age was 30 years. For every 100 females, there were 94.7 males.  For every 100 females age 18 and over, there were 89.1 males.

The median household income was $35,588 and the median family income  was $40,000. Males had a median income of $30,066 versus $21,094 for females. The per capita income for the town was $13,918.  About 8.3% of families and 11.5% of the population were below the poverty line, including 16.7% of those under age 18 and 7.6% of those age 65 or over.

Education
Greenwood is in the Woodbridge School District. Its high school is Woodbridge High School.

Notable people
 Simeon S. Pennewill, politician, Governor of Delaware (1909–1913)
 Earle D. Willey, politician, US Congressman (1943–1945)
 Hugh M. Morris, attorney, US District Court Judge (1878–1966)
Mary Rawlinson Creason, honored aviator (1924–2021)

References

External links

 

Towns in Sussex County, Delaware
Towns in Delaware
Salisbury metropolitan area